MOPP (an acronym for "Mission Oriented Protective Posture"; pronounced "mop") is protective gear used by U.S. military personnel in a toxic environment, e.g., during a chemical, biological, radiological, or nuclear (CBRN) strike:

 Protective mask – Commonly referred to as a gas mask or pro mask. It is designed to filter harmful chemical and biological agents, as well as irradiated particles from the air to allow the wearer to breathe safely. No protective masks filter out gases such as carbon monoxide, and in situations requiring that level of protection, external breathing apparatus is employed.
 Mask carrier – Protects the mask from damage. It is usually worn as part of battle gear for easy access and usually contains a technical manual, extra filter, spare parts, chemical detection papers, and nerve agent antidote kits (NAAK).
 Over garments – Joint Service Lightweight Integrated Suit Technology (JSLIST) Specially designed clothing to be worn over the normal uniform. These garments are designed to allow maximum airflow for cooling while keeping chemical and biological agents from reaching the skin of the wearer. Some are equipped with a charcoal lining to neutralize some agents.  Military personnel often equip over garments with strips of M9 Detector Paper to identify chemical agents on the battlefield they might come in contact with.
 M9 Detector paper is worn to detect chemical liquid agents that a service member may brush against while in MOPP gear. It is worn in three different areas of the suit. It is worn on the dominant arm, bicep area, on the wrist of the opposite arm, and on the dominant leg, shin area. It is also placed on lower levels of vehicles for detection purposes.
 Gloves and overboots – (JSLIST) Highly durable rubber, designed with combat operations in mind. Used to prevent contact with agents.

MOPP protection levels 

Each MOPP level corresponds to an increasing level of protection. The readiness level will usually be dictated by the in-theatre commander.
Mask Only – Protective mask is carried.
MOPP Ready – Protective mask is carried. First set of suit, gloves, and boots are available within two hours, second set within six hours.
MOPP Level 0 – Worn: nothing.   Carried: Protective mask. Immediately Available: suit, boots and gloves.
MOPP Level 1 – Worn: suit. Carried: Protective mask. Immediately Available: boots and gloves
MOPP Level 2 – Worn: suit and boots. Carried: Protective mask and gloves.
MOPP Level 3 – Worn: suit, boots and mask. Carried: gloves.
MOPP Level 4 – All protection worn.

See also

References

External links
Mission-Oriented Protective Postures (MOPP)

Safety equipment
Environmental suits
Chemical warfare
United States Marine Corps equipment